Christa Tordy (born Anneliese Uhlhorn, 30 June 1904 – 28 April 1945) was a German film actress. She was discovered while visiting her cousin Mady Christians in Berlin, and briefly became a leading star before retiring after marrying Harry Liedtke. She was murdered along with her husband by the Soviet Red Army at her home during its invasion of Germany during World War II.

Biography
Christa Tordy was born Anneliese Uhlhorn on 30 June 1904 in Bremen. She spent her childhood in Wiesbaden after her father had retired there. There, she attended high school, graduating at age 17, and began studying art history, archaeology, philosophy, and literary history in Berlin and Munich, finishing her studies in Wrocław with a doctorate. During her time in school, she also participated in student theater, creating and staging plays.

In 1925, Tordy visited her cousin Mady Christians while she was working on the film A Waltz Dream. Tordy was noticed by director Ludwig Berger or cinematographer Werner Brandes, who persuaded her to undergo a screen test.

Tordy made her film debut in The Sea Cadet (1926), followed by His Toughest Case (1926). She next starred in Prinz Louis Ferdinand (1927) and Potsdam (1927), both alongside Hans Stüwe. Tordy's final screen appearance was in Love on Skis (1928), which she acted in with her husband Harry Liedtke.

Tordy and Liedtke married on 27 March 1928 and Tordy retired from the film industry shortly thereafter. She only appeared in 8 films during her career.

On 28 April 1945, Christa Tordy and Harry Liedtke were murdered by the Soviet Red Army. Liedtke had tried to save his wife from being raped and murdered, but died after either being smashed on the head with a beer bottle, or after being clubbed to death. Prior to their murder, the couple had attempted suicide.

Tordy and Liedtke's bodies were exhumed in October 1948 and they were buried at Waldfriedhof Saarow-Pieskow Cemetery. Upon Liedtke's ex-wife Käthe Dorsch's death in 1957, she was buried alongside the two.

Filmography
 The Sea Cadet (1926)
 His Toughest Case (1926)
 Prinz Louis Ferdinand (1927)
 Die Beichte des Feldkuraten (1927)
 Potsdam (1927)
 Das Geheimnis von Genf (1928)
The Countess of Sand (1928)
 Love on Skis (1928)

Bibliography
 Hardt, Ursula. From Caligari to California: Erich Pommer's Life in the International Film Wars. Berghahn Books, 1996.

References

External links

1904 births
1945 deaths
German film actresses
German silent film actresses
Actors from Bremen
German civilians killed in World War II
20th-century German actresses